Jalen Lorenzo Virgil (born July 13, 1998) is an American football wide receiver and return specialist for the Denver Broncos of the National Football League (NFL). He played college football at Appalachian State.

College career
Virgil was a member of the Appalachian State Mountaineers for six seasons, redshirting his true freshman season. In his final season, he caught 15 passes for 226 yards and one touchdown and returned 26 kickoffs for a school-record 781 yards and two touchdowns.

Professional career
Virgil signed with the Denver Broncos as an undrafted free agent on April 30, 2022. He made the Broncos' initial 53-man roster out of training camp.

On November 13, 2022, Virgil scored a 66 yard touchdown on his first career reception during a 17–10 loss to the Tennessee Titans.

References

External links
Appalachian State Mountaineers bio
Denver Broncos bio

Living people

1998 births
American football wide receivers

Players of American football from Georgia (U.S. state)
Appalachian State Mountaineers football players
Denver Broncos players